Aleksejs Vidavskis  (19 September 1943 – 1 July 2020) was a Latvian politician who served as a member of the Supreme Council of Latvia, as a mayor of Daugavpils, and as a deputy in the 8th and 9th Saeima (Latvian Parliament).

Biography

Early life
Vidavskis was born in Daugavpils, Latvia on September 19, 1943 when the city was under Nazi control as a part of the Reichskommissariat Ostland. He graduated from the Riga Polytechnic Institute in 1979 while working various positions at the Daugavpils Chemical Fiber Factory from 1966 to 1987.

Political activity
He served as a member of the Supreme Council of Latvia from its establishment in 1990 until he and 14 other members who had voted against the Declaration of Independence were removed for "acting contrary to the Constitution."

Vidavskis was elected mayor of Daugavpils from the Harmony Centre party despite not being a member of the party at the time. He served as mayor from 1994-2001. He also served two terms as a deputy of the Saeima. He began his term in the 8th Saeima on November 5, 2002 and began his term in the 9th Saeima on 7 November 2006.

He supported Latvia joining the European Union in interviews.

Retirement and death
Vidavskis retired from politics after his second term in the Saeima ended on November 2, 2010. He is reported to have moved to Višķi for a quiet retirement. He died on July 1, 2020 at the age of 76, and his memorial service was held at Ss. Boris and Gleb Cathedral in Daugavpils on July 3.

References

External links
Saeima website
Historical membership of the Saeima (in Latvian)

1943 births
2020 deaths
Politicians from Daugavpils
Latvian people of Russian descent
Deputies of the Supreme Council of the Republic of Latvia
Deputies of the 8th Saeima
Deputies of the 9th Saeima